Myrmecina bawai is a species of ant in the family Formicidae.

Distribution and habitat
This species has been observed in the Indian state of Mizoram. They reside on the forest floor of the eastern Himalayan hills in small colonies of 30 to 150 individuals. They are found under rocks, fallen trees, and leaves.

Etymology
This species is named after professor Kamaljit S. Bawa.

References

insects described in 2021
insects of India
Myrmeciinae